Don Gonyea (born 1956) is an American journalist. He currently serves as the national political correspondent for National Public Radio's All Things Considered, Morning Edition, Weekend Edition, and Here and Now programs.

Gonyea began working for NPR in 1986, reporting on the automobile industry and labor issues in Detroit.

He was part of the team that in 2000 won the Peabody Award for a series called Lost & Found Sound.

Gonyea is a 1978 graduate of Michigan State University, where he worked for the public television station, WKAR-TV. He was awarded the 2013 WKAR Public Media Master Award by the MSU College of Communication Arts and Sciences.

References

External links
NPR biography

1956 births
Living people
American reporters and correspondents
NPR personalities
Michigan State University alumni
Radio personalities from Detroit
20th-century American journalists
American male journalists